Himgiri Zee University is a Private university located in Dehradun, Uttarakhand, India.

References

External links
 

Private universities in India
Universities in Uttarakhand
Universities and colleges in Dehradun
Educational institutions established in 2003
2003 establishments in Uttarakhand